Round Lake is a glacial lake located in Snohomish County, Washington near Sloan Peak. The lake is an area for hiking and fishing.

References

Lakes of Washington (state)
Lakes of Snohomish County, Washington